St Michael and All Angels' Church is the parish church of Houghton-le-Spring, Tyne and Wear, England.
The church dates from the late 12th century and contains the tomb of Bernard Gilpin.

External links
Articles about the Church history
Church burial records
Extension to the Churchyard

References

Church of England church buildings in Tyne and Wear
Grade I listed churches in Tyne and Wear
Churches in the City of Sunderland